The Crash of the Emirate is a 1955 Soviet historical drama film directed by Vladimir Basov and .

Plot 
The film takes place in 1920. The West is trying to use the Bukhara Khanate to fight the Bolsheviks. Frunze and Kuybyshev go to Tashkent and raise the people against counterrevolutionaries.

Cast
 Yevgeny Samoylov as Mikhail Frunze
  K. Alimdzhanov as Yuldash Akhunbaev
 Vladimir Krasnopolsky as Valerian Kuybyshev
 Nelya Ataullaeva as Oigul  
 Mikhail Pugovkin as Yasny
 Vladimir Balashov as Osipov
 Yunona Belorucheva as Zhermen
 Mukhamed Cherkezov as Durdyev
 Vladimir Basov as White Guard officer
 Abid Dshalilov as Grand Vizier
 Andrey Fayt as Peyli

See also
 Emirate of Bukhara

References

External links 
 

1955 films
1950s Russian-language films
Mosfilm films
Soviet historical drama films
1950s historical drama films
Films directed by Vladimir Basov
Films set in 1920
1955 drama films